Events from the year 1961 in Jordan.

Incumbents
Monarch: Hussein 
Prime Minister: Bahjat Talhouni

Events

 Ahmad Lozi elected to the House of Representatives for the district of Amman.

See also

 Years in Iraq
 Years in Syria
 Years in Saudi Arabia

References

 
1960s in Jordan
Jordan
Jordan
Years of the 20th century in Jordan